Jimmy Marshall Franklin (May 16, 1948 – July 10, 2005) was an American aerobatic pilot. He performed at airshows, both solo and as part of teams, for over 38 years until his death at an airshow in Moose Jaw. Born and raised in Lovington, New Mexico, Franklin learned to fly at age 8 and bought his first airplane (a UPF 7 Waco) at 19 and flew his first airshow the same year.

Franklin was the first pilot to receive the Art Scholl Memorial Showmanship award, and the only performer to win it twice.

Biography
Jimmy Franklin was born May 16, 1948 in Lovington, NM. When he was 12, Franklin dragged his father's airplane out of the hangar while the elder Franklin was away, and took it for his first solo flight. "I had buzzed all the neighbors," he later recalled.

Franklin obtained his private pilot's license at 17, followed by his commercial pilot's license at the age of 18. He purchased his first airplane, a Waco, when he was 19 and began performing his own routines at airshows.

He would continue to develop various routines, from single-plane aerobatic acts, to multi-plane dogfighting simulations, to more dangerous routines such as a plane-to-plane inflight baton pass. He perfected a ribbon grab pass where he would fly inverted and grab a ribbon with the tail of the aircraft. Once he picked up a ribbon that was suspended between two Coca-Cola bottles.

Franklin is the only airshow pilot to be "red flared" at EAA AirVenture Oshkosh—a signal from the airshow controllers that an unsafe act has been seen, commanding the pilot to immediately land. At the show in 1975, his debut there, he had been flying inverted for his ribbon-grab when the aircraft's tail made contact with the grass, resulting in the flare. The penalty meant he was barred from participating in airshows for nearly 3 years.

In the 1990s, he and Les Shockley, the inventor of the Shockwave Jet Truck, modified his Waco, attaching a General Electric J85 jet engine to the underside. It was in this aircraft that Franklin's son Kyle became the first person to wing-walk on a jet powered aircraft.

Franklin began performing with Jim LeRoy in 2001, where they would dogfight and perform mock attacks on Shockley's jet truck. In 2002 the pair and Bobby Younkin formed the X Team, which was popularly known as the Masters of Disaster after the name of their aerobatic routine.

On July 10, 2005, Franklin and Younkin collided in mid-air while performing their Masters of Disaster routine. Both pilots were killed.

Franklin's son Kyle married Younkin's daughter Amanda in 2005. The two would continue in aerobatics with Kyle flying and Amanda wing-walking. On March 12, 2011, Kyle's Waco lost engine power and crashed during an airshow. Both were injured in the crash and subsequent fire, and Amanda died of her injuries on May 27.

Awards received
 1986: Art Scholl Memorial Showmanship Award (inaugural recipient)
 1989: Bill Barber Award for Showmanship
 1990: General Aviation News and Flyer "Reader's Choice" Award for Favorite Overall Performer
 1996: General Aviation News and Flyer "Reader's Choice" Award for Favorite Specialty Act
 1999: Art Scholl Memorial Showmanship Award
 1999: Clifford W. Henderson Achievement Award
 2007: ICAS Foundation Airshow Hall of Fame

References

1948 births
2005 deaths
American aerobatic teams
Aviators killed in aviation accidents or incidents in the United States
People from Lovington, New Mexico
Victims of aviation accidents or incidents in 2005